Zacata is an unincorporated community in Westmoreland County, in the U. S. state of Virginia.  The ZIP Code for Zacata is 22581.

References

GNIS entry

Unincorporated communities in Virginia
Unincorporated communities in Westmoreland County, Virginia